Artex Ltd. is an English-based manufacturer of building materials.

History
Artex was started in 1935, with the name Artex coming from “Asbestos Reinforced TEXtured Coating”.

Artex became part of the BPB Group of companies in 1966. It merged with Blue Hawk sometime in 1997. Blue Hawk had been bought by the BPB Group in 1972. BPB was in turn purchased by Saint-Gobain, a large building products company based in France in November 2005.

Brands
It owns several brands, some of which have become genericized and are known and recognised as household words. Its brands include:
 Artex Textured Coating
 Gyproc Plasterboard
 Thistle Plaster
 Blue Hawk

Structure
It has its head office and main manufacturing base at Ruddington, Nottinghamshire, with an additional manufacturing site for texture and liquid products in Newhaven, East Sussex.

References

External links 
 

Manufacturing companies of England
Manufacturing companies established in 1935
Companies based in Nottinghamshire
Building materials companies of the United Kingdom
1935 establishments in England